Shova Gyawali (Nepali: शोभा ज्ञवाली ) is a publisher, author and media owner, as well as the director of Nepal Republic Media Pvt. Ltd. She is President of the Nepal-Philippines Chamber of Commerce and Industry.

She is Senior Vice President of the Federation of Women Entrepreneurs Association of Nepal (FWEAN) and a Life Member and Executive Committee Member of SAARC CCI, as well as an Executive Member of Chambers of Commerce and Industry that promote bilateral economic activities between Nepal and Australia (NACCI), Brazil, and India (NBCCI).

References 

Year of birth missing (living people)
Living people
Place of birth missing (living people)
Nepalese women in business
Nepalese businesspeople